The National Intelligence Agency (NIA) is a counterintelligence and security agency of Thailand. It serves as part of the Office of the Prime Minister. Its headquarters is in Paruskavan Palace, Bangkok.

History
The government established the Department of Administrative Intelligence under the Cabinet of Thailand on 1 January 1954. Phao Sriyanond was appointed as its first director. On 2 December 1959 it was renamed the Department of Central Intelligence and renamed again as the National Intelligence Agency (NIA) during the government of Prime Minister Prem Tinsulanonda.

In 1985, the "National Intelligence Act, B.E. 2528 (1985)" made the NIA the lead Thai intelligence agency. The reality as of 2016 was that seven Thai intelligence agencies—the NIA, Army Intelligence, Navy Intelligence, Air Force Intelligence, Supreme Command Headquarters' Intelligence, Special Branch Bureau, and National Security Command Headquarters—mostly function independently of one another.  In 2017, a plan was hatched to consolidate the efforts of 27 separate Thai intelligence agencies.

News reports appearing in early 2020 indicate that Thailand was a customer of Crypto AG, a Swiss company secretly owned by the US CIA and West German Federal Intelligence Service (BND) that manufactured compromised encryption machines. Use of the devices may have allowed its coded messages to be deciphered.

Budget
The FY2019 budget of the NIA is 717.8 million baht.

References

Thai intelligence agencies
Government departments of Thailand
Office of the Prime Minister (Thailand)